Fyodor Mikhailovich Chubukov (21 June 1920 — 1 June 1988) was a Soviet fighter pilot during World War II. Awarded the title Hero of the Soviet Union on 19 August 1944 for his initial victories, by the end of the war his tally reached 30 solo and five shared shootdowns.

References 

1921 births
1988 deaths
Soviet World War II flying aces
Heroes of the Soviet Union
Recipients of the Order of Lenin
Recipients of the Order of the Red Banner
Recipients of the Order of Alexander Nevsky
Recipients of the Order of the Red Star